Jørnevik Station is a railway station located on the Bergensbanen railway line.  It is located at the village of Jørnevik in Voss municipality, Vestland county, Norway. The station was served by one daily departure per direction by the Bergen Commuter Rail until its closure in 2012. There is no road connection to the station.

External links
 Jernbaneverket's page on Jørnevik

Railway stations in Voss
Railway stations on Bergensbanen
Railway stations opened in 1936
1936 establishments in Norway